Kinathukadavu, is a town panchayat suburb of Coimbatore city and taluk in Coimbatore district.

Kinathukadavu may also refer to:

 Kinathukadavu (state assembly constituency)
 Kinathukadavu Block
 Kinathukadavu railway station
 Kinathukadavu taluk